James Howard Mittelman (born November 29, 1944) is an American scholar and author. Born in Marinette, Wisconsin, he spent much of his early life in Cleveland, Ohio. He is a political economist noted for his analyses of globalization and development. Mittelman is a Distinguished Research Professor and University Professor Emeritus at American University's School of International Service in Washington, D.C.

Career 
After studying at the University of East Africa in Kampala, Uganda, Mittelman obtained his doctorate from Cornell University in 1971. Subsequently, he was a professor at Columbia University; the University of Denver, where he served as dean of the Graduate School of International Studies (today the Korbel School) from 1983 to 1987; and the City University of New York, where he was dean of the Faculty of Social Science, Queens College from 1987 to 1991. Mittelman also has held teaching and research appointments in Japan, Mozambique, Singapore, South Africa, and Uganda. In addition, he held the Pok Rafeah Chair in International Studies from 1997 to 1999 at the National University of Malaysia, was a member of the Institute for Advanced Study from 1998 to 1999 in Princeton, New Jersey, and is currently an Honorary Fellow at the Helsinki Collegium for Advanced Studies at the University of Helsinki.

Mittelman has also served as the founding Director of the International Studies Program from 1981 to 1983 at The City College of the City University of New York, founding Chair of the Department of Comparative and Regional Studies from 1992 to 1994 at American University, and Vice President of the International Studies Association (ISA) from 2006 to 2007. In 2010, Mittelman was named the recipient of the ISA's Distinguished Scholar Award in International Political Economy, and in 2015 he was selected as an honoree of the ISA Global South Caucus. His books and articles have been translated into several languages, including Chinese, Japanese, Portuguese, and Spanish.

Research interests 
Mittelman's primary research interests include:

 Globalization
 Development with an emphasis on sub-Saharan Africa and Eastern Asia
 Political Economy
 Global Governance
 Knowledge and Power

Selected publications

Other professional activities 
Mittelman has worked at the United Nations and with civil society organizations. His op-eds, letters to the editor, and articles have appeared in The New York Times, The Washington Post, Financial Times, and elsewhere. He has made numerous appearances on radio and television.

Personal life 
Mittelman is married to Linda J. Yarr, a research professor at George Washington University. They have three children.

References 

American University faculty and staff
1944 births
Living people
Cornell University alumni
University of East Africa alumni
Columbia University faculty
University of Denver faculty
American university and college faculty deans
Queens College, City University of New York faculty
National University of Malaysia
Writers about globalization
Writers about Africa
Political economists
21st-century American economists
20th-century American economists